Daniel Andres Espino (born January 5, 2001) is a Panamanian professional baseball pitcher in the Cleveland Guardians organization.

Amateur career
Espino was born and raised in Panama. He came to the United States during the Summer of 2016 with the Albany Paulies Baseball Program in Albany, Georgia; program that help him to find an opportunity to move to the United States as a sophomore in high school and began attending Georgia Premier Academy in Statesboro, Georgia. As a senior in 2019, he went 9-0 with a 0.32 ERA. He committed to play college baseball at Louisiana State University.

Professional career
Espino was drafted by the Cleveland Indians in the first round, with the 24th overall selection, of the 2019 Major League Baseball draft. He signed for $2.5 million and made his professional debut with the Arizona League Indians. After pitching to a 1.98 ERA over six starts, he was promoted to the Mahoning Valley Scrappers. Over nine starts between both teams, Espino went 0-3 with a 3.80 ERA, striking out 34 over  innings. Espino did not play a minor league game in 2020 due to the cancellation of the season.

Espino split the 2021 season between the Lynchburg Hillcats and the Lake County Captains, starting twenty games and going 3-8 with a 3.73 ERA and 152 strikeouts over  innings.

He was assigned to the Double-A Akron RubberDucks to begin the 2022 season. He made 4 starts for the team, recording a 1-0 record and 2.45 ERA with 35 strikeouts in 18.1 innings pitched. He was placed on the injured list in May with patellar tendinitis, and did not make another appearance in 2022. In December, it was announced that Espino had missed the remainder of the year due to a sore right shoulder.

On February 20, 2023, Espino was shut down from throwing for eight weeks after suffering a right shoulder strain and additional muscle tear in the same shoulder.

References

External links

2001 births
Living people
Sportspeople from Panama City
Panamanian expatriate baseball players in the United States
Baseball pitchers
Arizona League Indians players
Mahoning Valley Scrappers players
Lake County Captains players
Lynchburg Hillcats players
21st-century Panamanian people